Two Royal Norwegian Navy patrol boats have been named Snar (quick):

 , a  launched in 1887
 , a 

Royal Norwegian Navy ship names